Rehm is a surname, and may refer to:

 Albert Rehm, a German philologist known for his work on the Antikythera mechanism
 Bill Rehm, an American politician
 Diane Rehm, an American public radio talk show host
 Erich Rehm, a German highly decorated Hauptmann der Reserve in the Wehrmacht during World War II
 Hans Rehm (disambiguation), multiple people
 Fred Rehm, an American basketball player
 Heinrich Rehm, a German mycologist and lichenologist
 Karin Baumeister-Rehm (born 1971), a German artist
 Markus Rehm, a German amputee and Paralympian
 Pam Rehm, an American poet
 Rüdiger Rehm, German former footballer who is now manager of SG Sonnenhof Großaspach
 Rush Rehm, an associate professor of drama and classics at Stanford University
 Shane Rehm, a New Zealand rugby league referee
 Verena Rehm, a backing vocalist and pianist of the euro-trance dance group Groove Coverage
 Wolfgang Rehm (1929–2017), German musicologist

Other
 Louis Rehm Barn, a barn in Hebron, North Dakota, listed on the United States National Register of Historic Places
Surnames from given names